Raj Nair  is an Indian author and filmmaker who writes in his native language Malayalam and English.

Biography
His first poem was published at the age of eleven followed by short stories and his first novel in the year 2000, Nishabdathayile Theerthadakan (Pilgrim of Silence, DC Books). He has written and directed films including, Kaazhchavasthukkal (The Exhibits, 2004) and Punyam Aham (Limpid Souls, 2010).

Personal life 
Nair was born in Alappuzha and spent most of his younger years in Thakazhy and Kalarcode. He is currently a Professor of Oral Medicine in Australia. He was educated at Harvard University, University of London and holds a PhD from The University of Hong Kong. He is the grandson of acclaimed Malayalam writer, Thakazhi Sivasankara Pillai.

References

External links
Official website

Malayali people
Malayalam-language writers
Malayalam novelists
Malayalam short story writers
Indian male novelists
Indian male short story writers
20th-century Indian novelists
People from Alappuzha district
Writers from Kerala
Living people
21st-century Indian film directors
1967 births